José Simões de Almeida is the name of two Portuguese sculptors:
  (1844–1926), uncle of the other one
 José Simões de Almeida (sobrinho) (1880–1950), nephew of the other one